Vitória Guimarães B is a Portuguese football team founded in 2012. They are the reserve team of Vitória Guimarães. Reserve teams in Portugal play in the same league system as the senior team, rather than in a reserve team league. However, they cannot play in the same division as their senior team, so Vitória B is ineligible for promotion to the Primeira Liga and cannot play in the Taça de Portugal and Taça da Liga.

History

Establishment
Prior to the end of the 2011–12 football season in Portugal, seven clubs in the Primeira Liga announced their interest in constructing a B team to fill the six vacant places available to compete in the Segunda Liga for the 2012–13 season. Of those seven, five clubs were selected to take part in the competition considering their position on 2011-12 Primeira Liga, as well as Marítimo, since they had already a B team competing.

The LPFP who organizes the professional football tiers in Portugal announced that for the clubs to compete in the 2012–13 Segunda Liga they would have to pay 50,000 €. In addition the LPFP would also require the clubs to follow new rules regarding player selection in which each 'B' team must have a squad of a minimum of ten players who were formed at the club's academy as well as having an age requirement between 15 and 21 years old. The LPFP also went on to saw that the clubs are unable to compete in cup competitions as well as gaining promotion due to the possibility of playing the senior team. Each 'B' team may have 3 players above 23 years old.

In late May 2012, it was officially announced that the six Primeira Liga clubs' B teams would compete in the 2012–13 Segunda Liga which would increase the number of teams in the league from 16 to 22 as well as increasing the number of games needed to play in one season from thirty games to forty two games.

Start of play
Vitória B played their first game on 12 August 2012, a goalless home draw against S.C. Covilhã at the Estádio do Varzim SC in Póvoa de Varzim. The team ended their debut season with relegation in second-last place.

In 2013–14 under manager Armando Evangelista, Vitória B won instant promotion from the Campeonato Nacional de Seniores with a 2–0 aggregate win over Sport Benfica e Castelo Branco. Five years later, the team slipped into the third tier again in rock-bottom place, after a 2–2 draw with fellow northern reserve team S.C. Braga B on 7 May 2019.

Season-to-season record

Players

Current squad

Out on loan

References

External links
Official homepage

 
Football clubs in Portugal
Portuguese reserve football teams
2012 establishments in Portugal
Vitória S.C.
Liga Portugal 2 clubs
Association football clubs established in 2012